Phlox maculata, common names wild sweetwilliam and meadow phlox, is a species of flowering plant in the family Polemoniaceae, native the eastern United States and introduced to eastern Canada. It is a perennial.

The stiff stems are spotted red, hence the Latin specific epithet maculata. It prefers damp, well-drained soil in full sun. It is less prone to powdery mildew than the related Phlox paniculata. 

The following cultivars have received the Royal Horticultural Society's Award of Garden Merit:
 'Alpha' (lilac)
 'Natascha' (pink and white)
 'Omega' (white with a red eye)

References

maculata
Flora of Eastern North America